Bramham International Horse Trials is one of the Europe's leading three-day events, taking place every June at Bramham Park, near Wetherby in West Yorkshire. The event attracts around 60,000 spectators over four days of competition.

The Event

History 
The event first ran in 1974 under the direction of George Lane Fox, then owner of Bramham Park and was won by American rider Bruce Davidson from a field of only 25.  The horse trials has grown considerably over the years, gaining international status in 1981.  There has only been one cancellation in the event's history, which was in 2001 due to the foot and mouth disease epidemic.

The main horse trials regularly attracts in excess of 140 competitors internationally.  In 2012 Bramham attracted its largest ever field, and was used by many as a final run for the London 2012 Olympics.

In 2016 it was used as the Olympic Trial for the British Team, which was won by Gemma Tattersall.

Classes 
The horse trials is a 3-star level international event and hosts four classes: CCI*** senior; CCI*** British Under 25 Championship;  CIC***; and Event Rider Masters CIC***.

A host of other arena classes are held alongside the main event.  These include British Show Jumping classes; hunter and young stock classes; Burghley Young Event Horse competition; and a stallion parade.

Event Timetable

Notable Dates

References

Eventing
Equestrian sports in the United Kingdom
Equestrian sports in England
Sport in Leeds